Edward McEllister (c. 1809 – 12 May 1866) was a politician in the early days of the Colony of South Australia.

History
McEllister emigrated from Ireland, perhaps Tipperary arriving in December 1839 aboard Delhi and served as a mounted policeman stationed for a time at Port Lincoln, then some time before 1845 took up business in Rundle Street, Adelaide, which proved lucrative, and he retired in 1850.

McEllister was a member of the Legislative Assembly for the district of Yatala from March 1860 to November 1862. He failed to be re-elected due to his support for compulsory Bible studies in State schools. He served in the Legislative Council from 1865 until his death the following year. He was survived by a widow, two sons and a daughter.

Family
McEllister married Mary Sheridan (c. 1811 – 23 July 1893); they had three surviving children:
Susan Mary McEllister (1840 – 20 May 1887) married Hampton Carroll Gleeson (1834–1907) on 15 November 1860. They had five sons and two daughters.
Robert McEllister (c. 1842 – 13 January 1891)
Thomas Edward McEllister (c. 1845 – 19 November 1886) married Norah Teresa O'Leary of Wirrabara on 8 January 1879. They had no children. A commission agent and share dealer, he was convicted of forgery in February 1868 and sentenced to two years' hard labor.

References

Members of the South Australian House of Assembly
Members of the South Australian Legislative Council
1800s births
1866 deaths
19th-century Australian politicians